or  is a Norwegian lake that lies high in the mountains on the border of two municipalities: Evenes in Nordland county and Tjeldsund in Troms og Finnmark county.

The water from the lake flows through a pipe down to the hydroelectric powerstation near the village of Bogen in Evenes. The powerstation is owned by Evenes Kraftforsyning and is situated at almost  lower than the lake Niingsvatnet. The water from the powerstation then flows into the Strandvatnet lake. A short river goes from Strandvatnet past the village of Bogen to the Ofotfjord.

See also
 List of lakes in Norway
 Geography of Norway

References

Lakes of Nordland
Evenes
Tjeldsund
Reservoirs in Norway
Lakes of Troms og Finnmark